The Eastern Zone was one of the three regional zones of the 1958 Davis Cup.

5 teams entered the Eastern Zone, with the winner going on to compete in the Inter-Zonal Zone against the winners of the America Zone and Europe Zone. The Philippines defeated Ceylon in the final and progressed to the Inter-Zonal Zone.

Draw

Quarterfinals

Japan vs. Thailand

Semifinals

Japan vs. Philippines

Malaya vs. Ceylon

Final

Philippines vs. Ceylon

References

External links
Davis Cup official website

Davis Cup Asia/Oceania Zone
Eastern Zone
Davis Cup